In category theory, a branch of mathematics, a subfunctor is a special type of functor that is an analogue of a subset.

Definition
Let C be a category, and let F be a contravariant functor from C to the category of sets Set.  A contravariant functor G from C to Set is a subfunctor of F if
 For all objects c of C, G(c) ⊆ F(c), and
 For all arrows f: c′ → c of C, G(f) is the restriction of F(f) to G(c).
This relation is often written as G ⊆ F.

For example, let 1 be the category with a single object and a single arrow.  A functor F: 1 → Set maps the unique object of 1 to some set S and the unique identity arrow of 1 to the identity function 1S on S.  A subfunctor G of F maps the unique object of 1 to a subset T of S and maps the unique identity arrow to the identity function 1T on T.  Notice that 1T is the restriction of 1S to T.  Consequently, subfunctors of F correspond to subsets of S.

Remarks
Subfunctors in general are like global versions of subsets.  For example, if one imagines the objects of some category C to be analogous to the open sets of a topological space, then a contravariant functor from C to the category of sets gives a set-valued presheaf on C, that is, it associates sets to the objects of C in a way that is compatible with the arrows of C.  A subfunctor then associates a subset to each set, again in a compatible way.

The most important examples of subfunctors are subfunctors of the Hom functor.  Let c be an object of the category C, and consider the functor .  This functor takes an object c′ of C and gives back all of the morphisms c′ → c.  A subfunctor of  gives back only some of the morphisms.  Such a subfunctor is called a sieve, and it is usually used when defining Grothendieck topologies.

Open subfunctors
Subfunctors are also used in the construction of representable functors on the category of ringed spaces.  Let F be a contravariant functor from the category of ringed spaces to the category of sets, and let G ⊆ F.  Suppose that this inclusion morphism G → F is representable by open immersions, i.e., for any representable functor  and any morphism , the fibered product  is a representable functor  and the morphism Y → X defined by the Yoneda lemma is an open immersion.  Then G is called an open subfunctor of F.  If F is covered by representable open subfunctors, then, under certain conditions, it can be shown that F is representable.  This is a useful technique for the construction of ringed spaces.  It was discovered and exploited heavily by Alexander Grothendieck, who applied it especially to the case of schemes.  For a formal statement and proof, see Grothendieck, Éléments de géométrie algébrique, vol. 1, 2nd ed., chapter 0, section 4.5.

Functors